Jalan Kota Perdana, Federal Route 2486, is a federal road in Pahang, Malaysia.

At most sections, the Federal Route 2486 was built under the JKR R5 road standard, allowing maximum speed limit of up to 90 km/h.

List of junctions

Malaysian Federal Roads